"Get Me to the Church on Time" is a song composed by Frederick Loewe, with lyrics written by Alan Jay Lerner for the 1956 musical My Fair Lady, where it was introduced by Stanley Holloway.

It is sung by the cockney character Alfred P. Doolittle, the father of the one of the show's two main characters, Eliza Doolittle. He has received a surprise bequest of four thousand pounds a year from an American millionaire, raising him to middle class respectability. Consequently, he feels he must marry Eliza's stepmother, the woman with whom he has been living for many years. Doolittle and his friends have one last spree before the wedding and the song is a plea to his friends not to let his drunken merriment forget his good intentions and make sure he gets to his wedding.

Covers and parodies
On the children’s show Sesame Street, Oscar the Grouch and his girlfriend Grundgetta get engaged by accident, but they agree to get married anyway to have a huge trashy party. Amid the chaos of all the wedding preparations, Oscar sings "I'm Getting Married in the Trash Can", a spoof of "Get Me to the Church on Time"
On The Carol Burnett Show the song is performed by Burnett with The Pointer Sisters.
On Gavin & Stacey, Uncle Bryn is singing this song as he carries in the flowers for Gavin and Stacey’s wedding. Gwen, Nessa, and Stacey happily join in. The scene ends abruptly as Stacey’s brother, Jason, enters the room and whatever awkwardness exists between him and Uncle Bryn regarding the "fishing trip" evaporates the joy of the moment and everyone stops singing.

Notable recordings
André Previn and Shelly Manne - My Fair Lady (1956)
Bing Crosby recorded the song in 1956 for use on his radio show and it was subsequently included in the box set The Bing Crosby CBS Radio Recordings (1954-56) issued by Mosaic Records (catalog MD7-245) in 2009.

References

1956 songs
Andy Williams songs
Songs with music by Frederick Loewe
Songs with lyrics by Alan Jay Lerner
Frank Sinatra songs
Songs from My Fair Lady
1950s jazz standards
Songs about marriage